Septoria lactucae, or  lettuce septoria blight, is a pathogenic leaf fungus that is found on lettuce.

References

External links
 Index Fungorum
 USDA ARS Fungal Database

lactucae
Fungal plant pathogens and diseases
Lettuce diseases